The 2007–08 Ligat Nashim was the tenth season of women's league football under the Israeli Football Association.

As all 5 members of the previous season's second division folded, the league was contested as a single division.

The league was won by Maccabi Holon, its fifth consecutive title. By winning, Maccabi Holon qualified to 2008–09 UEFA Women's Cup.

League table

Top scorers

References
Israeli Football Association

Ligat Nashim seasons
1
women
Israel